This list of stage names lists names used by those in the entertainment industry, alphabetically by their stage name's surname, followed by their birth name. Individuals who dropped their last name and substituted their middle name as their last name are listed. In many cases, performers have legally changed their name to their stage name.

Note: Many cultures have their own naming customs and systems, some rather intricate. Minor changes or alterations, including reversing Eastern-style formats, do not in and of themselves qualify as stage names, and should not normally be included. For example, Björk, whose stage name appears to be an original creation, is part of her full Icelandic name, Björk Guðmundsdóttir. Her second name is a patronymic instead of a family name, following Icelandic naming conventions. "Björk" is not a stage name but how any Icelander would refer to her, casually or formally.

People are not listed here if they fall into one or more of the following categories:
 Those who have more than one family name, provided at least one is represented in the professional name. This is especially common with people from Spanish or Portuguese-speaking countries and in the Philippines.
 Those who changed their name to perform a character or alter ego, including drag performers and professional wrestlers.
Those who changed their name to undertake an alias, rather than a name with which the subject will publicly identify.
Those who changed their surname due primarily to marriage, even if the marriage has since ended.
 Those who changed their surname due to adoption or legal name change prior to entering the entertainment industry.
 Those known by nicknames both privately and professionally.
 Those who may be popularly, though not professionally, known by a nickname.
 Those who changed their name(s) due to realized change in sexual/gender identity, or other recognized gender-related reasons.
 Those who changed their names for religious reasons.
 Those who adopted a matriname:
 List of people who adopted matrilineal surnames
 Those who changed their name(s) due to other or unknown reasons unrelated to show business of any kind.

The following exceptions are listed here for the following reasons:
 Tupac Shakur is listed here, but under the stage name 2Pac. He was born either Lesane Parish Crooks or Parish Lesane Crooks, depending on the source, but his name was changed in early childhood to Tupac Amaru Shakur.
 Elton John is listed here because he used the name professionally before he legally adopted it in 1972.

List

A

B

C

D

E

F

G

H

I

J

K

L

M

N

O

P

Q

R

S

T

U

V

W

X

Y

Z

Other
Includes stage names beginning with numbers or other non-alphabetic characters.

See also 
 List of drag queens
 List of nicknames of blues musicians
 List of nicknames of jazz musicians
 List of people who adopted matrilineal surnames
 List of one-word stage names
 List of pen names
 Lists of professional wrestling personnel

References 

Stage names
Stage names
Stage